Mali Kamen is a settlement northeast of Senovo in the Municipality of Krško in eastern Slovenia. The area is part of the traditional region of Styria. It is now included with the rest of the municipality in the Lower Sava Statistical Region.

Mass grave
Mali Kamen is the site of a mass grave from the end of the Second World War. The grave contains the remains of 20 to 30 Ustaša soldiers killed in mid-May 1945.

Chapel
There is a small square chapel with a belfry in the settlement. It is dedicated to the Virgin Mary and was built in the 19th century.

References

External links
Mali Kamen on Geopedia

Populated places in the Municipality of Krško